The discography of South Korean girl group Loona consists of one reissue, five extended plays (EPs), and twelve single albums. From October 2016 to March 2018, the group's label, Blockberry Creative, released individual single albums for each Loona member as part of an 18-month pre-debut project. The pre-debut project eventually culminated in the release of "Favorite" on August 7, 2018, marking the group's first 12-member release. The single later appeared on [ + + ], which was released on August 20 with the single, "Hi High". The EP peaked at number two on South Korea's Gaon Album Chart and was later reissued as [X X] on February 19, 2019, with the lead single "Butterfly". The reissue reached number four on the Gaon Album Chart, while the single marked Loona's first appearance on one of Gaon's singles charts, reaching number 90 on the Download Chart.

The group's second extended play, [#], arrived on February 5, 2020, with the lead single "So What". While the EP reached number two on the Gaon Album Chart and became their highest charting effort to date, "So What" went on to peak at number 68 on the Gaon Download chart. Their third EP [12:00] arrived on October 19, 2020, with the album's lead single "Why Not?". The EP reached number four in the Gaon Album Chart. In 2021 the group fourth EP [&]  was released on June 28. It became their fastest and best selling project to date and earned the group their first ever entry on the Gaon Digital Chart. In September of the same year the group released their debut Japanese single which peaked in the top ten on the Japanese Oricon Singles Chart.

Remix albums

Extended plays

Reissues

Single albums

As solo members

Singles

Promotional singles

Other charted songs

Album appearances

Music videos

Notes

References

Discographies of South Korean artists
Discography
K-pop music group discographies